Ernest Robert Moore (November 1, 1869 – March 4, 1957) was an American politician and banker.

Born in Anamosa, Iowa, he moved with his family to Cedar Rapids, Iowa. He served in the Spanish–American War. He was a banker in Cedar Rapids. Moore served in the Iowa House of Representatives and as Lieutenant Governor of Iowa, serving under Governor William L. Harding. He died in Cedar Rapids, Iowa.

References

1869 births
1957 deaths
Politicians from Cedar Rapids, Iowa
People from Anamosa, Iowa
American military personnel of the Spanish–American War
Members of the Iowa House of Representatives
Lieutenant Governors of Iowa